is a small island in the Inland Sea of Japan. Administratively, it is part of the city of Imabari, Ehime Prefecture. The island is famous for mikan and butterflies. As of 2006, the population was about 1,000. The area is 3.13 km² and the circumference is 11.1 km. Access is from Imabari by fast or slow ferry boat, or by road from Kure.

Transportation
The island can be accessed by ferry from Imabari or from Ōmishima Island, Ehime. It can also be accessed by road from the city of Kure, Hiroshima Prefecture through the Akinada Islands Connecting Bridges. The last of these bridges, the Okamura Great Bridge, is a 228 metre long arch bridge which connects Okamura Island with Nakano Island.

Gallery

References

External links
Topographical map (Japanese government site)

Islands of Ehime Prefecture
Geiyo Islands